Bouthwaite is a hamlet in the Harrogate district of North Yorkshire, England. It is situated in Nidderdale, to the north of Pateley Bridge, close to the village of Ramsgill. The Nidderdale Way and Six Dales Trail both pass through the hamlet.

The place is first mentioned in 1184 as Burtheit.  The toponym means "cottage or store-house clearing", from the Old Norse búr and þveit.  Fountains Abbey owned the land in the Middle Ages and established a grange at Bouthwaite.

Between 1907 and 1930 Bouthwaite was the site of Ramsgill railway station on the Nidd Valley Light Railway.

References

External links 

Hamlets in North Yorkshire
Nidderdale